William Dean Shields (born August 23, 1954) is an American former professional football player who was an offensive tackle in the National Football League (NFL). He who played eleven seasons for the San Diego Chargers (1975–1983), the San Francisco 49ers (1984), the Kansas City Chiefs (1985) and the New York Jets (1985). Shields attended Georgia Institute of Technology. He was inducted into the Georgia Tech Hall of Fame in 1985.

References

1954 births
Living people
Sportspeople from Vicksburg, Mississippi
Players of American football from Mississippi
American football offensive tackles
Georgia Tech Yellow Jackets football players
San Diego Chargers players
San Francisco 49ers players
Kansas City Chiefs players
New York Jets players